Piazze is a village in Tuscany, central Italy, administratively a frazione of the comune of Cetona, province of Siena. At the time of the 2001 census its population was 724.

Piazze is about 92 km from Siena and 9 km from Cetona.

References 

Frazioni of the Province of Siena